Yasin Özdenak (born 11 October 1948) is a former Turkish football goalkeeper and now an active coach. He is currently employed by Hume City FC as the Technical Director of the Club.

Professional career
In 1977, Ahmet and Nesuhi Ertegun the  transferred Yasin, known in the United States as Erol Yasin, when he was 28 to the Cosmos where he played alongside football legends like Pelé and Franz Beckenbauer. Pelé was 35 years old and played 2 years with Yasin Ozdenak for New York Cosmos before he gave up playing.  Yasin also coached the Cosmos.

He was a goalkeeper and also, another legendary football player, Diego Armando Maradona had become opponent to Yasin Özdenak when Maradona was 18 years old at a friendly match.

He also managed Sydney Crescent Star, a team who at the time competed in the NSW Premier League in Australia. He led the team to a top 5 position in their first season as well as a victory in the Continental Cup (now known as the Tiger Turf Cup).

Personal life
Özdenak was born into a sporting family , as his brothers Doğan, Mustafa and Gökmen were also professional footballers. He has 2 other siblings Figen and Tuncay.

References

External links
 
 NASL stats

1948 births
Living people
People from İskenderun
Turkish footballers
Turkey international footballers
Turkey under-21 international footballers
Turkey youth international footballers
Turkish expatriate footballers
Turkish football managers
İstanbulspor footballers
Galatasaray S.K. footballers
New York Cosmos players
North American Soccer League (1968–1984) players
North American Soccer League (1968–1984) coaches
Süper Lig players
FC Seoul non-playing staff
Association football goalkeepers
Sportspeople from Hatay
Turkish expatriate sportspeople in the United States
Turkish expatriate football managers
Turkish expatriate sportspeople in Australia
Expatriate soccer managers in the United States